Edgar Norman Swane  (17 November 1927 – 15 January 2020), known as Ben Swane, was an Australian nurseryman.

Swane was a Sydney-based gardener. He was, until 2000, the proprietor of Swane's Nurseries at Dural, New South Wales and was for thirty years a gardening presenter on 702 ABC Sydney. 

He was made a Member of the Order of Australia in 2011 for "service to horticulture and to business, to the development and promotion of the Australian native plants export trade, and through executive roles with a range of industry-based organisations."

References

1927 births
2020 deaths
Australian gardeners
Australian radio presenters
People educated at Newington College
Members of the Order of Australia